Davran (also Romanized as Davrān, Dūrān, and Dūvarān; also known as Diran) is a village in Mojezat Rural District, in the Central District of Zanjan County, Zanjan Province, Iran. At the 2006 census, its population was 258, in 51 families.

References 

Populated places in Zanjan County